Gulma railway Station is a small railway station, which serves Northern regions of Siliguri Metropolitan Areas like Milan More, Debidanga, Kherjhora, Anchal, Champasari, Sisabari, Babubasa etc., in Siliguri, West Bengal. It is 10 km away from Siliguri Junction. It lies in New Jalpaiguri–Alipurduar–Samuktala Road line of Northeast Frontier Railway, Alipurduar railway division. The station lies near the Mahananda Wildlife Sanctuary. The other stations serving Siliguri are Siliguri Junction, Siliguri Town, Bagdogra, Matigara and New Jalpaiguri.

Trains
Some important trains like
Siliguri–Alipurduar Intercity Express
Siliguri–Dhubri Intercity Express
Siliguri Bamanhat Intercity Express

Other local trains like
 Alipurduar–New Jalpaiguri Passenger
 Bamanhat–Siliguri Passenger
 Dinhata–Siliguri DEMU
 Siliguri-New Bongaigaon DEMU
 New Cooch Behar–Siliguri Jn DEMU (via Changrabandha)
 New Jalpaiguri–Alipurduar Passenger special
 Bamanhat - Siliguri Junction DEMU
 Bamanhat - Siliguri Junction DEMU Special
 New Bongaigaon - Siliguri Jn. DEMU Special (via Dhubri - Mathabhanga)

are available from this station.

References

 Railway stations in Siliguri
Railway stations in West Bengal
Alipurduar railway division
Railway stations in Darjeeling district
Transport in Siliguri